Robbs Jetty railway station was a railway station, south of Fremantle between 1902 and 1972.

History

On 1 July 1903, the line was extended to Coogee. Initially the line was only served by freight trains; a passenger service began in 1913. The station was removed during the creation of the marshalling yard in 1972.

Robbs Jetty station was the near the Robb Jetty Abattoir and South Fremantle Power Station.

A large dual gauge marshalling yard with a four-storey signal box tower was built by the Western Australian Government Railways in the 1960s as part of the standard gauge project from Kalgoorlie to Leighton to serve local industries. With the closure of the power station in 1985 and the abattoir 1992, the yard was decommissioned and lifted. The site has been earmarked for residential redevelopment.

References

External links
Galley of Robb Jetty signal box SigWA

City of Cockburn
Disused railway stations in Western Australia
Fremantle line